Eva Melicharová (born 2 February 1970) is a former Czech professional tennis player.

Melicharová has a career-high WTA singles ranking of 234, achieved on 21 June 1993. She also has a career-high WTA doubles ranking of 47, achieved on 26 January 1998. In her career, she won two WTA Tour doubles titles and one ITF singles title and 22 ITF doubles titles.

Melicharová retired from professional tennis in 2001.

WTA Tour career finals

Doubles: 5 (2 titles, 3 runner-ups)

ITF finals

Singles (1–0)

Doubles (24–14)

External links

 
 

1970 births
Living people
Czech female tennis players
Czechoslovak female tennis players